A gray horse (or grey horse) has a coat color characterized by progressive depigmentation of the colored hairs of the coat. Most gray horses have black skin and dark eyes; unlike some equine dilution genes and some other genes that lead to depigmentation, gray does not affect skin or eye color. Gray horses may be born any base color, depending on other color genes present.  White hairs begin to appear at or shortly after birth and become progressively more prevalent as the horse ages as white hairs become intermingled with hairs of other colors. Graying can occur at different rates—very quickly on one horse and very slowly on another. As adults, most gray horses eventually become completely white, though some retain intermixed light and dark hairs. 

The stages of graying vary widely. Some horses develop a dappled pattern for a period of time, others resemble a roan with more uniform intermixing of light and dark hairs. As they age, some gray horses, particularly those heterozygous for the gray gene, may develop pigmented speckles in addition to a white coat, a pattern colloquially called a “fleabitten gray.” 

Gray horses appear in many breeds, though the color is most commonly seen in breeds descended from Arabian ancestors. Some breeds that have large numbers of gray-colored horses include the Thoroughbred, the Arabian, the American Quarter Horse and the Welsh pony. Breeds with a very high prevalence of gray include the Percheron, the Andalusian, and the Lipizzaner.

People who are unfamiliar with horses may refer to gray horses as "white".  However, a gray horse whose hair coat is completely "white" will still have black skin (except under markings that were white at birth) and dark eyes. This is how to discern a gray horse from a white horse.  White horses usually have pink skin and sometimes even have blue eyes. Young horses with hair coats consisting of a mixture of colored and gray or white hairs are sometimes confused with roan. Some horses that carry dilution genes may also be confused with white or gray.

While gray is classified as a coat color by breed registries, genetically it may be more correct to call it a depigmentation pattern.  It is a dominant allele, and thus a horse needs only one copy of the gray allele, that is, heterozygous, to be gray in color.  A homozygous gray horse, one carrying two gray alleles, will always produce gray foals.

Prevalence

Gray is common in many breeds. Today, about one horse in 10 carries the mutation for graying with age. The vast majority of Lipizzaners are gray, as are the majority of Andalusian horses. Many breeds of French draft horse such as the Percheron and Boulonnais are often gray as well. Gray is also found among Welsh Ponies, Thoroughbreds, and American Quarter Horses. All of these breeds have common ancestry in the Arabian horse. In particular, all gray Thoroughbreds descend from a horse named Alcock's Arabian, a gray born in 1700. The gray coat color makes up about 3% of Thoroughbreds.

Gray also affects spotting patterns of pintos and leopard complex horses such as Appaloosas. Its effects wash out the contrast of the markings of these patterns, sometimes colloquially described as “ghosting.”

Changes in the color of gray horses

A gray foal may be born any color. However, bay, chestnut, or black base colors are most often seen.  As the horse matures, it “grays out” as white hairs begin to replace the base or birth color. Usually white hairs are first seen by the muzzle, eyes and flanks, occasionally at birth, and usually by the age of one year. Over time, white hairs replace the birth color. The changing patterns of white and dark hairs have many informal names, such as “rose gray,” “salt and pepper,” “iron gray”, or “dapple gray.” As the horse ages, the coat continues to lighten, often to a pure white. Some horses develop pigmented reddish-brown speckles on an otherwise white hair coat. Such horses are often called “fleabitten gray”.

Different breeds, and individuals within each breed, take differing amounts of time to gray out. Thus, graying cannot be used to approximate the age of a horse except in the broadest of terms: a very young horse will never have a white coat (unless it is a true white horse), while a horse in its teens usually is completely grayed out. One must also be careful not to confuse the small amount of gray hairs that may appear on some older horses in their late teens or twenties, which do not reflect the gray gene and never cause a complete graying of the horse.

This change in hair color means that the same gray horse will appear to be a different color over time, sometimes resulting in a need to change the color noted on breed registry papers.  Other times, people traveling with gray horses who have a pure white hair coat have encountered problems with non-horse-oriented officials such as police officers or border guards who are unclear about a horse who has papers saying it is "gray" when the horse in front of them appears white.

To further complicate matters, the skin and eyes may be other colors if influenced by other factors such as white markings, certain white spotting patterns or dilution genes.

The genetics of gray

The gray gene (G) is an autosomal dominant gene. In simple terms, a horse which has even one copy of the gray allele, regardless of other coat color genes present, will always become gray.  This also means that all gray horses must have at least one gray parent.  If a gray horse is homozygous (GG), meaning that it has a gray allele from both parents, it will always produce gray offspring no matter the color genetics of the other parent. However, if a gray horse is heterozygous (Gg), meaning it inherits one copy of the recessive gene (g), that animal may produce offspring who are not gray, depending on the genetics of the other parent and Mendelian inheritance principles. Genetic testing is now possible to determine whether a horse is homozygous or heterozygous for gray.<ref>[http://www.animalgenetics.us/Gray.htm "Gray - Horse Coat Color DNA Testing."  Animal Genetics, Incorporated.'] . web page accessed August 29, 2008</ref>  The gray gene does not affect skin or eye color, so grays typically have dark skin and eyes, as opposed to the unpigmented pink skin of white horses.

In 2008, researchers at Uppsala University in Sweden identified the genetic mutation that governs the graying process. The study revealed that all gray horses carry an identical mutation that can be traced back to a common ancestor that lived at least two thousand years ago. The discovery that gray can be linked to a single animal provides an example of how humans have "cherry-picked" attractive mutations in domestic animals.

Gray is controlled by a single dominant allele of a gene that regulates specific kinds of stem cells. Homozygous grays turn white faster, are more likely to develop melanomas, and are less prone to develop the "fleabitten" speckling than heterozygous grays.

Researchers suggest the pigmented speckles of the “fleabitten” gray, as well as more intense reddish-brown colored areas called “blood” markings, may be caused by a loss or inactivation of the gray allele in some of the somatic cells as that would explain why the speckles are more common on heterozygous grays than homozygotes.

Melanoma in gray horses

The identification of the gray mutation is of great interest in of medical research since this mutation also enhances the risk for melanoma in horses: some studies have suggested as many as 80% of grays over 15 years of age have some form of melanoma. Growth rate depends on the type, and many are slow-growing, but over time, many develop into a malignant melanoma. 

The study of gray genetics has pointed to a molecular pathway that may lead to tumour development. Both STX17 and the neighboring NR4A3 gene are overexpressed in melanomas from gray horses, and those carrying a loss-of-function mutation in ASIP (agouti signaling protein) had a higher incidence of melanoma, implying that increased melanocortin-1 receptor signaling promotes melanoma development in Gray horses. Some studies indicate as many as 66% of melanomas become malignant, though other studies have found much lower rates, and in one case, zero.

Horse coat colors sometimes confused with gray

White horses

Many people who are unfamiliar with horses refer to a gray horse as "white".  However, most white horses have pink skin and some have blue eyes. A horse with dark skin and dark eyes under a white hair coat is gray.  However, a gray horse with an underlying homozygous cream base coat color may be born with rosy-pink skin, blue eyes and near-white hair. In such cases, DNA testing may clarify the genetics of the horse.

Roan

Some grays in intermediate stages of graying may be confused with a roan or a rabicano. Some heavily fleabitten grays may also be confused with roans. However, roans are easily distinguishable from grays: roan consists of individual white hairs on a dark base coat, usually with the head and legs of the horse darker than the rest of the body. Rabicanos also have intermixed white hairs primarily on the body with a dark head.  With gray horses, the head is often the first area to lighten, especially around the eyes and muzzle. Also, roans do not lighten with age, while grays always do.

The varnish roan is another unusual coloration, sometimes seen in Appaloosa horses, that, like gray, can change with age, but unlike gray, the horse does not become progressively lighter until it is pure white. Varnish roans are created by the action of leopard complex within breeds such as the Appaloosa and are seldom seen elsewhere.

Diluted colors

The dilution genes that create dun, cream, pearl, silver dapple and champagne coloring may occasionally result in confusion with gray.

Some horses with a particular type of dun hair coat known as a "blue dun", grullo, or "mouse" dun appear to be a solid gray. However, this color is caused by the dun gene acting on a black base coat, and horses who are dun have all hairs the same color; there is no intermingling of white and dark hairs. Also, dun horses do not get lighter as they age. Horses that are a light cream color are also not grays. These are usually cremello, perlino or smoky cream horses, all colors produced by the action of the cream gene. However, if a gray parent passes on the gene, the hairs will turn white like any other gray. Another cream-colored dilution, the pearl gene or "barlink factor", may also create very light-coated horses. Similarly, the champagne gene can lighten coat color, often producing dappling or light colors that can be confused with gray.

In spite of its name, the silver dapple gene has nothing to do with graying. It is a dilution gene that acts only on a black coat, diluting the coat to a dark brown and the mane to a flaxen shade. Horses that express the silver dapple gene (and do not have the gray gene) are born that color and it will not lighten. However, again, if one parent passes on the gray gene, the gray gene will again be dominant.

Mythology

Throughout history, both gray and white horses have been mythologized. As part of its legendary dimension, the gray horse in myth has been depicted with seven heads (Uchaishravas) or eight feet (Sleipnir), sometimes in groups or singly. There are also mythological tales of divinatory gray horses who prophesy or warn of danger.

See also
Albinism
Equine coat color
Equine coat color genetics

Notes

References
"Introduction to Coat Color Genetics" from'' Veterinary Genetics Laboratory, School of Veterinary Medicine, University of California, Davis.  Web Site accessed January 12, 2008

Horse coat colors